This is a list of characters from the animated television series ReBoot.

Most ReBoot characters are named after technical computer terms or pieces of computer hardware.

Main characters

Bob 
Guardian 452 and  the defender of Mainframe from both internal and external threats. Bob is often criticized by other Guardians for his unorthodox views regarding viruses: unlike other Guardians, who believe that viruses should simply be deleted on sight. Bob theorizes that viruses can be reprogrammed to live as Sprites (he cites Hexadecimal as proof of his theories). Despite this criticism, Bob is still respected as one of the finest Guardians ever to come out of the academy. Compared to Dot, he usually does things "on the fly", and is an extremely casual and laid-back hero in the first two seasons. After living and partially degrading in the harsh Web (under the alias "Interface") he became slightly more cautious, more sensitive and less impulsive than he used to be. Despite the difference in their personalities, he and Dot developed romantic tension that results them in coupling at the end of Season 3.

He is equipped with a Guardian Keytool, "Glitch", which can transform into any device with a voice command. When a Guardian is first introduced to a Keytool, they exchange code. In Season 3 and 4, Bob bonds with Glitch (referred to in My Two Bobs as "Glitch-Bob") and gains energy-based Keytool powers. As Glitch was broken at the time and because Bob's code was missing from Glitch (Megabyte stole the code from Glitch before crushing it at the end of Season 2) the merger did not quite work. The continued use of his powers (including rebooting) lead to total fragmentation. Eventually they were separated; Glitch now upgraded in design and power regained his original form.

While he was always in favour of non-violent solutions, in Season 4 he opposed to deletion of virals under any circumstances, which caused conflict with other characters like Matrix. The reasons for this change (as he had deleted viral Binomes by destroying ABC craft before) was not directly expressed on the show, but presumably it was the result of both Hexadecimal's reprogramming and his experiences of war-torn Mainframe.

Bob was voiced by Michael Benyaer in seasons 1 and 2, and Ian James Corlett in seasons 3 and 4, though Benyaer returned near the end of season 4 as the voice of the fake Bob and eventually as the voice of the real Bob, which led to a tongue-in-cheek comparison between the two where Dot commented that fake Bob "even sounds more like the real Bob".

Bob's name was chosen by the members of the production team after they saw an episode of British sitcom Blackadder, and were amused by the way actor Rowan Atkinson pronounced the name Bob. (Blitter Objects), which were also a graphic element in Amiga computer systems.

Dot Matrix 
The daughter of leading Mainframe scientist Welman Matrix, Dot originally was his assistant as a teenager. Now an adult and proprietor of Dot's Diner, Dot also acts as her younger brother Enzo's surrogate parent and guardian since the loss of their father. (What became of their mother is never mentioned in the series.) She later became the command.com of Mainframe in place of Phong. She is admired for her brilliant and invaluable tactical skills, which led to her becoming a workaholic with business interests in most of Mainframe. Although she and Bob took until Season 3 to admit it, they are attracted to one another and this sometimes leads to awkward moments between them. When their father was nullified in the Twin City explosion, Dot and Enzo became each other's only remaining family, and for a long while she was adamant about keeping him from Games.

As Command.Com, she had to fight two successive Viral Wars from a position of inferiority and was forced to make many morally grey decisions, such as having Enzo go into a Game and stay there until he grew into a new Matrix as an insurance policy. It is a sign of her tactical skill that she was able to keep fighting against Megabyte, even with the loss of Enzo and the Principal Office, and then be able to cause some serious damage to Daemon. The emotional stress of the Viral Wars took their toll after the defeat of Daemon, and she fell for Megabyte's plan to impersonate the original Bob out of a desire to get back to the good times and forget all the pain and horror. After this, she came up with a plan that captured Megabyte and his entire Neo-Viral army in one swoop, but this was undone when it was revealed they had only caught a copy of Megabyte and the real virus was inside the War Room.

Dot was voiced by Kathleen Barr.

Her name is a reference to the method of using an array of dots to generate characters, symbols and images. The dot matrix was once widely used in the form of dot matrix displays and dot matrix printers. It is possible that her name may also be a hidden reference to a sentient machine with an identical name from the film Spaceballs.

Enzo Matrix 
Dot's little brother, Enzo, hero-worships Bob and intends to become a Guardian. He has a crackling, mid-pubescent voice and often uses catch-phrases such as "alphanumeric" and "high-density" in place of real-world utterances like "cool" and "awesome" to express enthusiasm. Enzo is very energetic and loves to play games like Jet Ball and Circuit Racing, and eagerly heads into the Games. Despite his youth, Enzo has proven to be extremely good at the Games and has several times been responsible for winning them.

With the destruction of the Twin City, most of Mainframe's Sprites were nullified and Enzo grew up with few friends to play with (it is unknown why he did not have Binome friends; presumably they avoided him because of his father's supposed role in the Twin City's destruction). His main friend growing up was Frisket until he met AndrAIa and brought her to Mainframe. The two have become inseparable since then.

Guardian Matrix 
When the Web invaded, Bob gave him a field rank as Guardian Cadet with the promise of sending him to the Super-Computer to be a real Guardian; when Bob was lost in the Web, Enzo found himself as the defender of Mainframe. He did well, gaining self-confidence and the approval of the populace, but eventually a Game came down he could not win, leading to his development into Matrix. When Mainframe was rebooted at the end of Season 3, Matrix had accidentally left his icon in "Game Sprite" mode, causing the system to recognize Enzo as missing, and so created a second Enzo using the last available data on him, which was some time before the episode "Talent Night".

It is revealed in "Talent Night" that the number on his shirt refers to his age, as written in binary notation, as it changes from "01" to "10" at the end of the episode.

Matrix 
Adult Enzo Matrix, who, due to the dimensional difference of the game world (in the middle of season 3) aged quicker, making the time frame in the game world seem longer than it actually is. Ashamed of the child he used to be, whom he viewed as weak after his vicious defeat by the User Zaytan, he prefers to be addressed by his surname "Matrix" instead of his given name, which reminds him of his childhood. With a cold and gritty personality, violent behavior and a "built-like-a-tank" physique (so physically built, in fact, that he was able to match Megabyte physically in a fight) he is nothing like the child he used to be. He was tempered by what was from his perspective a lifetime of fighting. Although he is quick to anger he has still shown a desire to help those in need (albeit in a very gruff and violent way) and his quest to return to Mainframe has let him bring many systems back from the brink of annihilation. He harbors an unparalleled hatred towards viruses and will not hesitate to delete them in a violent and merciless manner. He is in love with AndrAIa, who has now matured as well, but is also quite jealous and protective of her. Deep down, he had a fear that he might become or already be a hate-driven, uncaring killer who had forgotten about his home and family and would end up like Megabyte; he had to face his fears and get past them in the episode "Number Seven" (based on The Prisoner). He would several times show an extreme temper, aiming a gun at Ray Tracer during arguments, and he instinctively raises his gun when surprised by something that might possibly be dangerous (including if he is bumped into).

His right eye was severely damaged in the lost game that took him from Mainframe, but was at some point replaced with a cybernetic eye during his travels. This eye grants him extended visual powers, such as magnified long-range vision and X-ray vision. Matrix has also acquired a firearm, the aptly named "Gun", which has many functions that Matrix invokes with voice commands. Gun operates in a fashion similar to a Guardian Keytool, possibly because Matrix idolized Bob as a child. Matrix's mechanical eye also works in conjunction with Gun for lock-on targeting and tracking purposes. One of his gun's functions is "Death Blossom Mode" (a reference to the movie, The Last Starfighter) which allows the gun to hover in midair spinning rapidly in 720 degrees autolocking to all targets in sight. It is being implied that the gun has extremely high caliber, from single solitary blasts to Full-Delete rounds among possible explosive capabilities when he is seen shooting pursuing ships from the Saucy Mare, a ship he recovered for the Crimson Binome to travel to the Web. Matrix also carried Bob's damaged Guardian Keytool, Glitch, having recovered it as Enzo after Megabyte launched Bob into the Web; although this was mostly symbolic, as Glitch was rendered virtually nonfunctional, Matrix did continue to use Glitch for stats and information about games and systems he encountered. Matrix returned Glitch to Bob when they were re-united in the Web.

In a sign of development, Matrix finally spared a virus's life by not killing Megabyte when he was beaten and at his mercy. Having spent so long apart from Mainframe, he is filled with the desire to defend his home by any means necessary, making it seem as though Matrix had become much more belligerent during the first part of Season 4, and this stance caused a great deal of friction between him and Bob in Daemon Rising. Once Daemon was beaten, the two were much more friendly to each other, though Matrix was always having to deal with anxieties of what to do now there was no-one left to fight.

While he sometimes views the young copy Enzo as somewhat of an annoyance and grim reminder of what he used to be, he has come to accept the young Enzo as a little brother and strives to prevent him from becoming like himself.

With his tough-guy attitude, similar look (missing eye, sleeveless vest, and fingerless gloves), and imitative dialogue ("Call me Matrix!"), Matrix is likely inspired by the character of Snake Plissken, or possibly the gruff, muscular, gun-toting, anti-hero, Cable, of Marvel Comic's X-Men franchise. Despite Matrix's appearance, his actual age is only "11" (in binary) due to accelerated game time.

Matrix was voiced by Paul Dobson.

Little Enzo 
The new Enzo looks up to his older self as much as he does Bob, and briefly wanted to be just like him and demanded everyone call him "Little Matrix". When Daemon took over Mainframe, Enzo (whilst wearing the Guardian uniform that Bob gave the original Enzo in season two) saved the System with the help of Frisket, Hack and Slash, getting Matrix to snap out of Daemon's infection and help disinfect others so they could fight the virus.

Frisket 
A feral dog who likes Enzo, who acts in a threatening manner toward just about everyone other than Enzo and AndrAIa, with a particular dislike of Bob. Frisket has uncanny physical strength, comparable to that of Megabyte, being known to catch cannonballs (and ABCs) in his teeth. Frisket is extremely loyal to Enzo and would not hesitate to sacrifice his life to protect Enzo's. Frisket followed Enzo and AndrAIa into the games during season three.

His name is derived from the masking technique that is used by artists.

Phong 
System administrator and keeper of the core for Mainframe who lives and studies in the Principal Office. He was also the command.com of Mainframe until passing the title to Dot. A wise old Italian sprite somewhat evocative of Confucius, he often dispenses advice in the form of confusing and vague philosophical quotes gleaned from old README files. Very fond of Pong, one must defeat him in a game to be considered worthy of his knowledge. Phong is immune to infection by  viruses, but not super-viruses (Megabyte was never able to infect him, but Daemon infected him quite easily). When the Viral Wars started, Phong was an invaluable aide and comforter to Dot. He was captured by Megabyte, his head cut off (it was later reattached), and had data extracted from his mind, but he refused to surrender and fought Megabyte to the last. One of his passwords was revealed to be "Yaddi Yaddi Yadda!"

Phong always has the right equipment or knowledge, often handy in whatever sort of situation; in one episode, Bob was shocked to find that Phong had prepared a countermeasure specifically to handle a giant monster made entirely of Nulls stomping around the city. He acts a wise therapist whom many come to for advice about their problems, but the majority of the time his advice isn't very helpful and he urges for sprites to figure things out on their own.

The character Phong's name is an allusion to the game Pong—he has a rule that any who seek his advice must first play him in a game of physical Pong, shown on-screen in the first few episodes—and to Phong shading, an interpolation method (itself named after computer scientist Bui Tuong Phong) used in three-dimensional graphics rendering. Phong shading was used to render this character, as opposed to the simpler Gouraud shading used on other characters.

Main villains

Megabyte 
The main antagonist of the series, Megabyte (voiced by Tony Jay) is a virus, originally operating out of the Silicon Tor in Sector 1000 and dominating most of G-Prime. Megabyte plots constantly to corrupt and control Mainframe in order to turn it into his own domain, "Megaframe", and from there infect the Super-Computer and then take the entire Net. His secondary objective is to destroy his sister Hexadecimal, which is apparently just viral sibling rivalry. He is a malignant virus able to infect other programs, and commands an army of infected Viral Binomes. He has a brutal, almost psychopathic nature and speaks with a deep British accent. Megabyte possesses fantastic physical strength, super agility and reflexes as well as the ability to jump great distances. He can quickly scale high walls with vicious Wolverine-like extendable claws on his knuckles, as well as finger tips with extending nails similar to Lady Deathstrike. He has an exceedingly cunning intellect as well as the ability to infect and control objects. Another ability he has shown is the ability to read memory from certain sprites, namely Phong (Infected). He also manages to steal Bob's exchanged Guardian code with Glitch. Megabyte has no sense of morality and consistently takes advantage of others to achieve his own ends. He also seems immune to the energy-draining effect of nulls (as he has been seen holding his pet null "Nibbles", whom he once called "Father"). Megabyte can also store codes to control programs and functions of what ever system he is in, provided he has been given said codes.  These programs are controlled by buttons located under a panel in his left arm.

Megabyte also has a sense of humor and musical talents, as shown in the episode "Talent Night" when he crashed into Enzo's birthday party, accompanied by armed guards, but instead of his usual evil antics, he began to play a rock song on a forked guitar, which led to his and Bob's famous rock duel. Afterwards, Megabyte remarked "I've always wanted to do that", and left, but not before giving Enzo his guitar as a birthday gift.

Megabyte's origin is revealed in the fourth season. He and Hexadecimal were once one virus (Killabyte), who was scheduled for deletion by the Guardians, but upgraded into Gigabyte before it could be carried out. He mortally wounded Bob's partner and moved in toward Bob before being accidentally teleported away by Welman Matrix's gateway device. The results were devastating: the destruction of Mainframe's twin city (creating Lost Angles), everyone present being nullified (including Welman, who became Nibbles), and Gigabyte being split into Megabyte and Hexadecimal. Upon being separated, Megabyte observed his surroundings and walked off – intent to carry out his agenda on an unsuspecting city.

While always a villain, in earlier episodes Megabyte was often involved in humorous situations and rarely caused permanent damage; the exception to this was the first episode, "The Tearing", where he deliberately causes a whole Sector to be nullified. As time went on, and especially after ReBoot was no longer on the ABC Network, he became far more evil. He appears to have some small sense of honor, shown in one instance when Bob saves his life, Megabyte later let Dot go in the same episode, after which he commented "Now, we are even".

In the final episode of Season 2, Megabyte worked with Mainframe to close the Web portal that had opened in Mainframe, but not without heavy cost. Unfortunately, just before his "hardware" was fired at the portal to close it, he threw Bob into a rocket and sent it soaring into the portal. The portal was then closed, and he had his army move to crush the remaining defenders (CPUs) of Mainframe. For the first three episodes of Season 3 he had complete air supremacy and full run of Mainframe, while its defenders were trapped in the Principal Office. He also left Enzo alive so he could launch a propaganda campaign focusing on how the Guardian was an inexperienced boy, thus demoralizing the denizens of Mainframe. Obscenely, he also imprisoned Hexadecimal and forced her into becoming a living weapon, electrocuting her viciously via a collar at the slightest whim. "Rather good, isn't it?", he remarked to Enzo about his latest "weapon".

He was finally trapped behind an inverted Firewall that covered all of G-Prime. Unfortunately, shortly afterwards a rampaging Hexadecimal took out the Firewall; resulting in war between the viruses that devastated G-Prime (including the Tor) and neighboring Sectors.  Needing a new base, and as the Principal Office shields were still offline (having been deactivated to provide energy for the Firewall) Megabyte was able to conquer it by force. Mainframe became Megabyte's long sought after Megaframe. Instead of re-building it "in his own image" (as he so frequently says), he more left it as a decaying and devastated system that was perpetually on the verge of crashing. When Matrix and Bob returned to the system, Mainframe's rebels were finally able to bring down the Viral forces. During the battle, Megabyte was confronted by Matrix, who was carrying his sidearm: Gun. Megabyte convinced Matrix to drop his weapon and fight him hand-to-hand, as the virus believed that "the boy" would be no match for him physically.  However, this was proven to be false when Matrix ultimately defeated him in battle. Megabyte was enraged when Matrix spared his life, and as an act of desperation he tried to escape to the Super-Computer. However, Mouse managed to change the address of the portal Megabyte was using, and as a result he was trapped in the Web. He made a brief return in the form of a holographic simulation, which Megabyte had created to taunt anyone who went into the System's Core to prevent it from crashing.

Megabyte survived in the Web due to sharing some of Bob's Guardian code, and in the fourth season he became a Trojan Horse virus, gaining the ability to look and sound like any sprite or binome he is able to steal code from. He returned from the Web in the form of Bob circa Seasons 1–2, deliberately trying to confuse everyone over who the real Bob was in order to attack his enemies emotionally. He had also switched objectives from world conquest to personal revenge. His plan worked so well, he almost ended up married to Dot, until Glitch retook Bob's stolen code and forced him back into his Viral form. Megabyte immediately fought the real Bob, but he was surprised by Bob's increased power and was forced to retreat.

Afterwards, Megabyte began building an army of Neo-Virals, but was swiftly captured by the CPUs along with his whole horde, or so everyone thought. That Megabyte was in fact an alias, a fragile copy of himself, while the real Megabyte had infiltrated the Principal Office in the form of Frisket. He swiftly infected the War Room and had his enemies isolated throughout the building, telling them to prepare for "the Hunt".

Megabyte has an unusual habit of separating his torso from his legs when he is plotting at the Tor, and has a hovering chair to move him around when in this state.

He has been in Games five times, showing the ability to infect the User's in-game avatar. His last two Games were played when he was disguised as Bob; he was able to reboot and handled the Games quite well, though he asked Matrix to cheat in Panzu Heavy X (My Two Bobs) when panicked about the number of opponents. His Game appearance in "Bad Bob", when a corrupted Game merged him with and a device stealing the Core energy, was the Megatruck. Bob drove him in this episode, and was alarmed to discover the Megatruck had no brakes.

His name is a reference to a megabyte.

Nibbles 
Megabyte's pet null, whom he refers to as "Father" several times throughout the series. Nibbles' identity as a Sprite does not become clear until the fourth season.

His name is a reference to a nibble or nybble, 1/2 of a byte.

Hack and Slash 
Hack (voiced by Phil Hayes in season one, Scott McNeil in season two) and Slash (voiced by Garry Chalk) are twin robots, identical in form except that Hack is red and Slash is blue. The pair originally served Megabyte, carrying out his orders, often in a very incompetent manner - their first appearance had Bob tricking them into crashing into each other. By Season 2, they had degraded in villainy to the point where they twice ask Bob for help (the episode "Bad Bob", when trapped on a speeding Megatruck, and  the episode "Nullzilla" after losing Megabyte's pet null) and also assist him in battling Gigabyte (saving him at one point). Hack and Slash have great physical strength. They once lifted and destroyed a very large bridge with ease in the episode Medusa, and both proved strong enough to punch the greatly sized Gigabyte out to the floor, or even high and far up in the sky. Hack is also once seen to have three arms.

In Season 3, they reconsidered their loyalties after being instructed to kill Cyrus, who had betrayed Megabyte. Though both were reluctant to carry out those orders, Slash freed Cyrus at the last moment. When Hack pointed out how mad Megabyte would be, Slash responded, "Ah, what's new? I miss Bob. Bob always stopped us before we did anything really bad. Now, nobody does". Meanwhile, Megabyte had grown weary of their incompetence and ordered them to take point when battling Hexadecimal. They were promptly blown to bits. Phong found and repaired them (as well as gave them PIDs), and they switched sides to Mainframe to work as bodyguards and gofers for Dot. Hack and Slash were the first regular characters to re-encounter the returned Bob and Matrix, and they were quite overjoyed to see them again.

In Season 4, they were often seen hanging around Enzo and helped him play a key role in stopping Daemon. They also assisted in a Game, the first one they were shown in since acquiring PiDs. Also, Hack refused to allow Slash to mention the "M" word out of fear that their old boss would ever come back. When Megabyte did return and began fighting Bob, Hack and Slash were unsure of whom to help. Later, they flew away screaming at the idea someone might be Megabyte. The two were last seen taking Dot out of the Command Center (and panicking), as Megabyte took over the Principal Office.

Hack and Slash are frequently torn apart, although they seem to take it in stride. They used to talk in very babbling and over-running dialogue, but halfway through Season 2 they became more coherent. They are quite dimwitted and bumbling, despite their strength. They have built-in jetpacks that allow them to perform and maintain VTOL flight. They can also control their limbs remotely - they often get blown up and can still operate every movable part even though they are literally in a thousand pieces.

Their names are a reference to the hack and slash genre of computer games, and the keyboard characters \ (hack) and / (slash).

Hexadecimal 
Hexadecimal (voiced by Shirley Millner), the self-proclaimed "Queen of Chaos", is a virus operating out of Lost Angles. She is Megabyte's sister, serving as the chaos to his order. Her origin is revealed in the fourth season. She and Megabyte were once one virus (Killabyte), who was scheduled for deletion by the Guardians, but upgraded to Gigabyte before it could be carried out. He mortally wounded Bob's partner and moved in toward Bob before being accidentally teleported away by Welman Matrix's gateway device. The results were devastating: the destruction of Mainframe's twin city (creating Lost Angles), everyone present being nullified (including Welman, who became Nibbles), and Gigabyte being split into Megabyte and Hexadecimal. Upon being separated, Hexadecimal observed her surroundings and (with a mask change) exclaimed, "I like it here!".

Hexadecimal is melodramatic and extremely emotional, able to switch emotions by a simple wave of her hand (which changes the noh-styled mask she wears, and her emotions along with it). The masks change constantly in a slew of different ways, usually while obscured from the home viewer. Episodes 1 and 10 of season 2, and episode 4 of season 3 showed her mask changing on screen in an instant. She has transfinite power reserves, meaning that she has near limitless stores of energy to draw from, and as such, is quite powerful herself. Her powers include energy beams and fireballs, altering gravity (once causing Bob to stop and hover in midair) and being able to fly, shrugging off severe damage and controlling nulls (sprites downgraded to slug-like status for losing to the User in a game). She also has the power to open a portal to the net or web in her "looking glass", and has also been seen taking control of system programs like the system paint program. It is suggested that her powers are near infinite, but because of her madness she is unable to use them for anything constructive.

Her vast collection of masks serve to show her facial expression, thereby giving her a harlequin-like appearance. The expressions shown in these masks can range from happy, sad, scheming, and even homicidal rage. These masks also hold her power in check. When removed (as in the episode "Painted Windows"), her power escapes and continues to do damage to her environment, and she will overload and be destroyed if the mask is not replaced.

She is a benign virus, meaning she does not infect other entities. Instead, her primary motive is to simply cause random chaos for fun (and also to kill Megabyte, who kept trying to kill her, likely due to simple sibling rivalry). Due to her power and insanity, her fun nearly always led to Mainframe crashing. She even once nearly caused it unwittingly, when a Web Creature emerged from her mirror and possessed her. All of the nulls sensed this danger and covered her completely. The giant "Nullzilla" monster went on a rampage, as (according to Dot) the possessed-Hexadecimal was trying to escape.

In Web World Wars, Hexadecimal was charged with powering the Hardware that closed the web portal. Despite her interest in Bob, she knew of Megabyte's impending betrayal and even helped launch him into the Web. After closing the portal, she aimed the Hardware at the Principal Office. Megabyte merely saw this as a threat to force the Mainframers compliance to his whims, but she wanted to destroy the Core – not caring that that would destroy the entire System, including herself. Luckily, a Game Cube landed on top of the Hardware and the energy feedback from the Cube, along with the energy charge that she had already infused in the hardware, seriously damaged her. Megabyte subsequently had her rebuilt and had her enslaved as a weapon he could use against Mainframe (via a collar around her neck that caused her extreme pain when she did not comply with his wishes). This served only to further elevate her rage against Megabyte. Though she appeared to be completely restrained, Herr Doktor theorized she was faking and "liked being tied up", which Megabyte preferred not to think about. When she finally did escape Megabyte's control, her "rattling of her brother's bones" devastated G-Prime and the surrounding sectors. Spending the rest of her days lurking in Lost Angles, she made her presence known again with the return of Bob.

When Bob returned, she abducted him for demented party games and would eventually have killed him. However, he was able to defragment her head with his new powers. His glitch powers were able to replace her masks and her insanity with a real face (which looked exactly like her masks, but was able to move) and more harmless quirkiness. However, she still felt the need to off Herr Doktor and Bunnyfoot vengefully (and comedically) by turning them into biscuits. In the episode End Prog, with the System about to restart, Bob insisted that Phong give Hex an Icon (or PID) to register her with the Principal Office so she would be backed up. Mainframe restarted and a viral scan disinfected all the Virals, but Hexadecimal (with the icon) remained intact, remarking that the scan merely tickled.

Hex being her nickname for short, could also refer to her dark powers, and the Medusa Bug she used as a curse against everyone, in Web World Wars, Mouse comments referring to Hex, "Just tell the witch to be ready!", to which Hex responded, "I heard that! What a sweet thing to say!".

By Daemon Rising, she had begun openly and heavily trying to seduce Bob. In order to make him happy, she used her powers to drive out Daemon's forces; this weakened her powers enough for the viral scan, which had remained in her Icon, to start again, and she covered herself with Nulls to stop it. When the Null-cocoon fled as a Game landed on her, she became a normal, powerless Sprite; wearing a new costume of white lace and gold instead of black leather and red, with normal-looking eyes and black hair.

Strangely enough, Hex retained her control over Nulls, even though the rest of her powers had been stripped away. Upon revealing her origin to Dot, she began referring to her as "Sis". When Daemon conquered Mainframe, Hex was rejected as an abomination by Daemon for abandoning her viral code. At the end of the episode "Sacrifice", with Bob in danger of dying, she had given away her new life as a pure Sprite to become her old reckless and insane viral self just to stop Daemon. To do this, she absorbed Mainframe's core energy with the help of Phong, and became as powerful as Daemon herself to try to stop the infection. She did not succeed unfortunately, as Daemon's "cron virus" (a virus defined to attack at a specific time) took hold of the Net. "Ill" again, Hex did not realize the severity of the situation until Bob told her that she would not survive the crash, and she made the decision to fragment herself into the Net as a "benign virus" to undo everything that Daemon had done. She took the cure from Matrix's icon and then gave the young Enzo a special code on his icon that would later give his null-father the ability to talk once more. Before she went in, she told Bob that she had always loved him and told Dot to take care of him.

Her sacrifice symbolizes two themes previously stated in the show. "Love conquers all boundaries" (AndrAIa, S4 episode 3): Hexadecimal decides to fight Daemon's countdown due to her love for Bob and desire for him to survive. "Chaos will always triumph over Order; it is the way of things" ("Game Over"); Daemon's purpose is stated by Turbo to bring order to the Net, and the self-styled Queen of Chaos fights her to a standstill and cures the Net of the infection.

Her name is a reference to hexadecimal notation.

Scuzzy 
Hexadecimal's familiar. A cat-sized animal with a video screen on its head. Named after SCSI, which stands for Small Computer System Interface. Scuzzy is last seen in "Firewall".

The User 
The human operator of Mainframe is perceived by its denizens as a distant, impersonal, deity-like figure. Often destructive, it subjects the city to Game Cubes and assumes various avatars to do deadly battle with the unfortunates trapped within them. In layman's terms, the User is a computer owner that enjoys playing PC games, blissfully unaware of the havoc they are causing. Nonetheless, Mainframers dutifully petition the User to bestow upon them gifts such as increased memory and software upgrades, prayers which are sometimes answered despite the User's sadly limited means. Of all the characters depicted, only Fax Modem openly professed to deny the existence of the User, a position roundly regarded as wildly unorthodox and borderline insane. The User never appears on screen, although in the third-season finale its keystrokes could be heard as it entered the command to reboot the system.

Season one characters

Cecil 
 A video screen with a pair of arms, waiter at Dot's Diner before it was destroyed. Stereotypical French waiter complete with small moustache. He refers to himself as a "dedicated server", a play on his waiter job and Server (Computing). He greatly resembles the original Apple Macintosh, even his icon has rainbow stripes resembling the Macintosh logo. Although nearly the entire cast pronounces his name Cee-Cil, he has repeatedly asserted that it is actually pronounced Ceh-cil. (Unlike the rest of the cast, Dot pronounces it correctly.)  Cecil was originally limited to moving along a rail within the Diner (in other words, he was nearly sessile); after the Diner's destruction, Cecil's rail arm was attached to a hoverboard, allowing him freedom of movement,The Cecil Hotel in Vancouver was fairly close to MainFrame Productions Studio, and the logo on Cecil's chest also closely resembles that club's logo.

Al's Diner 
Al owns Al's Diner (also known as Al's Wait & Eat) on Level 31, and also serves as cook. According to his waiter, Al runs at 3 decahertz (30 Hz). Almost never seen, the only times he is explicitly shown on screen is when he is tied and completely covered up with rope in the episode "The Great Brain Robbery", and jumps in front of the camera in the third-season finale after the system is restored, having been apparently sped up he offers a fast and excited "Woo-hoo!" to the viewer. He is a one-binome with a chef's hat. One running gag throughout the series is that whenever his name is said, whether someone is directly talking to him, or his name is just mentioned in conversation, he responds with "What?".

 Al's Waiter (Front Counter)  Never named in the series, he is a binome that stands behind the counter at Al's Diner. He speaks and acts very slowly. He is one of the sprites who disappears in "Trust No One". He was also the first to be infected by the returned Megabyte in Season 4.

 Al's Waiter (Roller Skater)  Also never addressed by name, he is flamboyant one-binome who acts stereotypically camp. Has made Bob a bit uncomfortable on a few occasions.

Mike the TV 
 An annoying, ambulatory television set from Bob's apartment who is constantly pitching bizarre products (like the famous Bucket-O-Nothing, free for only $99.99.99) or simply rambling on until somebody shouts at him to shut up. He is a seemingly obvious reference to Charlie and the Chocolate Factory´s Mike Teavee. Speaking into a mic, he appears at random moments to irritate the rest of the cast. His remote control ran away, so he cannot be turned off. He temporarily lived in Hexadecimal's lair when Bob left him with her in order to "cheer her up" after the events of Painted Windows. Mike keeps the secret that it is his fault the web creature was released into Mainframe - when he played an opera for Hexadecimal, a singer's high note shattered her mirror and allowed the creature to get her - and thus he is (indirectly) responsible for everything that happens after that. Mike apparently joined Scuzzy as her helper. He stayed in her lair until he, Scuzzy, Hack, and Slash were scared away by Nullzilla and met up with Bob. In later seasons, he stars as a war correspondent for Mainframe, and during his brief infection by Daemon becomes a televangelist.

 In the episode Enzo The Smart, Enzo slows the "clock cycles" of all the sprites making them dumber than they actually are. Mike the TV was the only character not affected because, as Enzo noted, he could not get any dumber.

Herr Doktor and Bunnyfoot 
 Megabyte's pair of one-binome evil scientists whose practices are disturbingly unethical. The Herr's hands are unlike any other binomes'; instead of mitten-like hands, he has actual fingers. This distinction is continually featured as comic relief in the series. The Doktor's fingers will be run over or somehow damaged, he will shout, "Mein digits!", and his hands will appear in bandages for the rest of the episode. Unlike the other Virals, he retained his Viral status and colors after Mainframe was restarted. The Herr's assistant Bunnyfoot is, in relation to other binomes, anatomically dishevelled, with his eye portion in the middle (he is a one binome rather than a zero binome) and has a brick as a foot, referencing Igor, the assistant of Doctor Victor Frankenstein who occasionally appears in some adaptations of Frankenstein. The pair were later turned into biscuits by a vengeful Hexidecimal but were restored when The User rebooted the system. Her Doktor was later seen as a Neo Viral though Bunnyfoot is unseen. Megabyte disguised himself as Her Doktor to escape custody.

Old Man Pearson 
 Old Man Pearson (voiced by Long John Baldry) wns a waste disposal system (analogous to a Windows Recycle Bin) and data dump in Sector 1001. Pearson is a cranky old binome with an Irish accent and is the former Codemaster known as Talon. As a Codemaster, Pearson possesses a Gibson Coil Pike weapon, a reference to science fiction writer William Gibson.

 He may have been named for one of ReBoot's co-creators, Ian Pearson.

Captain Gavin Capacitor 
Capain Gavin Capacitor (voiced by Long John Baldry) software pirate and captain of the Saucy Mare, he styles himself as "the Crimson Binome".

 Capacitor is a one-binome armed with a hook for a left hand and a peg leg in place of his right leg. He fits the pirate stereotype perfectly, complete with pirate catchphrase mutations such as "Shiver me templates!" and "By the code!" At heart, he is a romantic, driven at times by a sense of honor, comradeship and a desire to never go down without fighting. Captain Capacitor was referenced to Long John Silver and Captain Hook.

 He and his crew were only in the pirate game for the profit, raiding the Ports of Systems with lightning speed and co-ordination, but this ended when they arrived in Mainframe and Dot showed him that he could make more profit by legitimate business. Gavin then became a business partner of Mainframe until its Net Ports closed after the Web invasion. He did not get the chance to find new Systems to trade with, as Daemon took over and the Saucy Mare was forced to go on the run.

 The pirates teamed up with Matrix, AndrAIa and Ray Tracer, entering the Web to find and retrieve Bob. From there, they returned to Mainframe and assisted Dot's rebels in the war against Megabyte. To Gavin's regret, he had to sacrifice the Mare in order to wipe out Megabyte's remaining airforce, and mourned its passing. After the System restart, he worked on unrevealed missions designed to harry Daemon.

 His last name is a reference to capacitors. His first name is clarified to be a reference to ReBoot co-creator Gavin Blair (in the art book, he used Gavin Capacitor as his image, and all three co-creators had one character named after them in previous episodes).

The Crew of the Saucy Mare 
 Mr. Christopher Captain Capacitor's bookkeeper is a nerdy and timid zero-binome who's never seen without his laptop. His name is likely a tribute to Fletcher Christian, the Master's Mate from HMS Bounty. He may have also been named after Christopher Brough, president of Mainframe Entertainment. Mr. Christopher was referenced to Mr. Smee. 

 Princess Bula A giant one-binome on Captain Capacitor's crew with great physical strength, but she isn't very smart. Not actually a princess, but no one dares say otherwise. Mr. Christopher has a crush on her.

 Miss Sally A female zero-binome pirate who serves as raider and look-out for the Mare. She once stole Glitch.

 Mr. Andrew The one-binome pirate in charge of the steering wheel of Mare, who wears an eye-patch over his single eye. He was present during the search of Bob in the Web and at the Restart of Mainframe.

 Mr. Jimmy A zero-binome who is in charge of the ship's prison.

 Mr. Mitchell A wealthy one-binome whose appearance and manner recall Thurston Howell, III, in the sitcom Gilligan's Island.

 He may have been named for one of ReBoot's co-creators, Phil Mitchell.

Mouse 
 Mouse (voiced by Louise Vallance) knew Bob from back when he arrested her from trying to hack into the Super-Computer. A hacker extraordinaire with a sugary Southern accent, she is equipped with a katana to cut her enemies into small pieces, and a high-tech craft called Ship. Sometimes she is seen with another, smaller sword, but she rarely uses it. It is probably a wakizashi to complete a samurai's daisho, which consists of the two aforementioned swords.  She is first mentioned in the episode "The Crimson Binome", which hints at an untold encounter between Mouse and the pirate crew of the Saucy Mare; Bob, imprisoned in the ship's brig, finds Mouse's calling card (a stylized drawing of a mouse) on the wall, a clue to an avenue of escape.  She first appears on-screen in "The Great Brain Robbery", hired as a mercenary by Megabyte (during the episode, she calls him "big guy" and "Megababe"); she turned against him when it became obvious she had been double-crossed and was endangering a young child. She later returned in Season 2 to save Bob and Dot from Gigabyte and ended up as part of the main cast from then on. She had been hired by the Guardians to discover if there was a Web Creature in Mainframe; during the subsequent Web War and then the Viral Wars, Mouse's hacking skills became a major asset in thwarting Mainframe's enemies, including developing a Firewall so complex that Daemon could not get through it, and was blocked from multiple Systems.  Due to her invaluable assistance, Mouse is allowed to upgrade her icon (and AndrAIa's as well) to a full Mainframe icon which, among other things, created a backup of her that allowed her to be restored along with the native Mainframers after the system crashed ("End Prog").

 Mouse's canines are developed into what looks like fangs, as specified in the episode "Trust No One"; she is capable of snarling in a very animal-like way, displaying these canines as a threat posture. In "The Great Brain Robbery", she growls in a feral fashion at Megabyte when he tells her that he "doublecrosses whomever he pleases". She becomes a dear friend to Dot as one whom Dot can confide into and lean on when no one else is around; during Dot's wedding, Mouse was her Sprite of Honor. At some point between the episodes "End Prog" and "Daemon Rising", Mouse begins dating Ray Tracer.

 Her name is a reference to the computer mouse.

Binky and Algernon 
 Sir Algernon Cholmondley-Worthington III and Binky Ffarquarson, also known as the British Binomes, appear in several episodes acting as pilots and very stereotypically British. In times of mortal peril they utter such lines as "steady on", "jolly good", "fancy a biscuit" and "I'll put a brew on". The plane they are piloting almost always gets shot down in some way. These characters are possibly modelled on Biggles and friends.

Cyrus 
 A one-binome that worked for Megabyte on his own free will without having been infected. In Season 1, he was helping Dot rescue and reformat an entire Sector in order to free it from Megabyte, but defected for mercenary reasons and helped Megabyte try to steal all of the PIDs in the Sectors so that they could be infected. The plan went bottom-up, and Cyrus was infected and turned into Megabyte's boot-shiner. In Season 3 he was put in charge of a propaganda campaign against Enzo's ability to act as guardian, designed to demoralize Enzo and the general population. However, when both he and Enzo ended up in a game, Cyrus was forced to help defeat the User; when he discovered Enzo wanted his help and trusted him despite all he had done, he not only helped, but also saved Enzo's life. In this game he rebooted into Dick Dastardly, and Frisket rebooted as Muttely who snickered at Cyrus' disapproval of being Dastardly. His redemption did not last long, as Megabyte recaptured him as the Firewall went up and ordered his execution. Cyrus escaped thanks to Slash, but he was horrified to find no way out of G-Prime. Somehow, he and Scuzzy found a way to breach the Firewall, allowing him to escape and Scuzzy to enter to free Hexadecimal. However, a very happy and disinfected Cyrus is seen leading the chorus line's dance in the musical number at the end of Season 3.

Season two characters

Lens 
 Codemaster Lens appears in one episode ("High Code") of the original series. He is a Net-born member of the Codemasters, one of the most feared and dangerous sects in cyberspace.

 He later came to Mainframe to challenge Codemaster Talon, who had taken refuge in Mainframe, but is known to the Mainframers as "Old Man Pearson". Amazed by the Mainframers determination to stand by Pearson, he left the System in peace.

 Lens had a distinct code of honor, barely spoke to other characters, and was described as a terrifying hunter by Phong. Using his Gibson-Coil pike, he was able to teleport, knock over buildings, wield energy bludgeons, and imprison Bob's Keytool, Glitch, behind a force field. Lens refers to himself as belonging to "The Sixty-Second Brotherhood", and by the titles "the Reaper" and "the Clear Unfolding".

AndrAIa 
 (Pronounced like the name Andrea in Italian) A backup copy of a Game Sprite who met Enzo in an undersea-themed game. She fell in love with him at "first sight." The original AndrAIa piggy-backed her icon on Enzo's. This allowed the backup to escape the game and stay in Mainframe with Enzo, but the original remained in the game.

 Because of the nature of the game from which she was born, AndrAIa has many mermaid-like qualities: she wears fish-skin garments, wears starfish in her hair (which can be used like a shuriken with boomerang qualities), and utilizes such armaments as paralysis-inducing fingernails and a trident in combat. She also possesses a superior hearing ability. In her younger form, she was new to the ways of Systems, not used to anything but fighting Users. She also appeared highly naive, such as believing Enzo's lies about being a Guardian (though she later admitted she always knew the truth, but didn't care because of her feelings for him). Over time, she began adapting and learning how to operate, and knew to try to keep Enzo's confidence up during his early days as Guardian. During the period of her and Enzo's journey through the Games in search of Bob and a way back home, she matures into a statuesque beauty who continually tries to temper her lover's cynicism, and provides a more relaxed and diplomatic counterpart to Matrix, however has shown to become very lonely when separated from Matrix. It is also during this time when AndrAIa improved as a warrior and gained engineering skills.

 During their journey, she is more than often the voice of reason, and despite Matrix's jealousy, befriends the newcomer Ray Tracer whom assists them in entering the WEB. Before actually entering the dimension; however, AndrAIa is bitten by a Web creature that steals her energy as well as part of her code. Through the majority of the trip in the Web she remained in a comatose state while the others fought against the environment in search of Bob and the creature that bit her. Incidentally, Bob finds them and heals AndrAIa with the recovered code and energy.

 During Daemon Rising, AndrAIa saves Matrix from being transported to the Super Computer and is infected by Daemon. After Daemon's defeat, AndrAIa becomes a bridesmaid in Dot's wedding and is last seen with Mouse in the Principal Office catacombs during the beginning of Megabyte's Hunt.

 The AI in her name is capitalized, as her name is a reference to Artificial Intelligence. As an AI Game Sprite, she is designed to adapt to her surroundings and experiences; as a result, she is a more adjusted sprite than Matrix despite suffering the same traumas. She also gets on better with the new young Enzo than Matrix does, effectively being a second big sister (Dot is still his first). Also, andraia (Ανδρεια) is a Greek word meaning courageous.

 She also has a great fondness for motorcycles.

Gigabyte 
 Gigabyte (voiced by Blu Mankuma) Class-5 (energy absorbing), malignant, extremely powerful super-virus, he is the upgraded form of Killabyte. A signal from Welman Matrix's experimental gateway accidentally locked onto Gigabyte and brought him to Mainframe. The gateway overloaded and Mainframe's twin city was destroyed in the explosion, becoming the small ruin called Lost Angles. Gigabyte was separated into Megabyte and Hexadecimal, making the siblings effectively opposite parts of the same whole; Megabyte representing order and Hexadecimal representing chaos.

 Gigabyte was briefly reformed in Season 2 - his first appearance on the show - when Megabyte, possessed by a Web Creature, merged with Hexadecimal. Upon formation, he announced "I am become Gigabyte, Destroyer Of Systems!", a reference to the Bhagavad Gita. Luckily for Mainframe, Hexadecimal's power had been drained at the time and Gigabyte was not at full strength, forced to feed off the energy of individual Sprites. Mainframe was powered down to keep him from gaining power and the System's defenders, helped by the newly returned Mouse, attempted to keep him contained. He was finally beaten when Bob trapped him inside a Tear and used its energy to split Gigabyte once again.

 His name comes from the unit of computer memory, measuring approximately one billion bytes (1,024 megabytes).

Fax Modem and Data Nully 
 CGI special agents. They are one-binomes modelled on Fox Mulder and Dana Scully from the X-Files, and their names are references to the Fax Modem and Data Nully. Gillian Anderson, the actress who portrayed Dana Scully, also provided the voice for the character Data Nully. Modem believes there is no User and the Guardians drop Games on Systems to promote the User myth. They were called into Mainframe to investigate the rash of disappearances and helped battle the Web Creature behind them.

Turbo 
 Prime Guardian and leader of the Guardian Collective. He is equipped with a Guardian Keytool, Copland, which can transform into any device with a voice command. He speaks with a Texan accent.

 Turbo was forced to order the destruction of Mainframe after a Web Creature arrived in the system. Turbo regretted the decision due to his friendship with Bob and secretly increased the countdown on the bomb he had hidden with Mouse. Although Bob got rid of the bomb, Turbo was considered by many to be an enemy after that. When Matrix encounters Turbo in a distant system, he is searching for Bob, the only Guardian known to not be infected by Daemon. Turbo informs Matrix of the Daemon threat, as well as the necessity of finding Bob. As he could still fight the infection, Turbo promised to work against Daemon from inside the Guardian Collective. However, when next the two met, Turbo had succumbed completely to Daemon's infection. As a result of that, Copland (following Turbo's own orders) had left him. After being partially cured by Bob's incomplete Guardian code, Turbo provided valuable information which helped Mainframe fight back against the super-virus.

 After Daemon's defeat, Turbo returned to his position as Prime Guardian. He was later reunited with Copland when all of the keytools returned to free Glitch-Bob from his encasement.

 His name is possibly a reference to turbo mode which increased the clock speed of some early Intel processors (ex. 8088 and 80286) for faster performance.

 Copland is possibly a reference to the unreleased Copland operating system created by Apple.

Class-M Webcreature 
 Not technically a virus, but attracted to them and later revealed to have been sent by Daemon. Its first act upon reaching Mainframe was to attack and bond with Hexadecimal (turning her into a creature resembling Spider-Man's enemy, Venom), causing the System's nulls to swarm over her in an attempt to keep the Webcreature from the rest of Mainframe. After Hexadecimal's powers were drained by the nulls, the creature escaped and bonded with Megabyte. In both cases, the resulting symbiote was highly animalistic and under the control of the Webcreature. It turned out the Webcreature, slowly growing from a spider-like blob into an immense fanged alien horror, needed to drain energy from others to remain stable outside of the Web - first it went for Hex and her transfinite energy reserves, then it had Megabyte merge with Hex to form the energy-absorbing Gigabyte, and finally it abducted scores of Sprites on Level 31 and slowly drained their energy in a larder. Its victims rescued and the CPUs keeping it cornered by direct torchlight (as it could not stand strong, bright lights), it finally escaped towards a Tear - as a Class M, it could turn Tears into Portals to the Web, and using that it escaped back to its home.

 A Class-M in a System with Net access is a dangerous threat, as it could lead to the Web being able to invade the entire Net. As a result, Guardian protocol is to completely destroy such a System in order to be sure of terminating the Webcreature and any others that might also be there.

 The term "Class-M" may be a joke reference to Star Trek's frequent use of the term "Class-M" planet.

Web Spores 
 An alien army that invaded Mainframe through the Class M's Web-Portal. They show a hive mentality and a sense of co-operative strategy, able to form traps for CPU attack craft. Their strategy is to send in Probes first, mostly unaggressive beings that inspect a System for potential threats, and then sending in the aggressive warrior Spores once they have worked out the layout. Their numbers are vast, capable of overrunning and crashing entire Systems, and only a CPU/ABC alliance was able to defeat them.

Season three characters

Powerlock 
 A large, overly muscled, gun-toting virus, modeled on action heroes and the gun-toting comic book anti-heroes of the early 90s (Most directly the Punisher, as indicated by the skull-like logo he wore on his chest). He was downloaded into an isolated System populated by energy beings called Spectrals. He was openly a member of the Hero Selective, the System's Sprite defenders against Games, and kept his viral nature hidden while he tried to cause System crashes. His true nature was discovered by Matrix and he was deleted. He had an unnamed partner, a Viral Spectral.

Ray Tracer (The Surfer) 
 A "second generation" Web search engine introduced in Season 3, he became a main character upon the return to Mainframe. He is unique in that as long as even a piece of his board exists, he will continue to live, as he and his board are the same entity. Though they may be separated, as long as one piece exists, it will regenerate and his body will as well. A side effect of this is that when he and his board are separated, any damage to his board is reflected on his person in the nature of the lights that circulate on his body shorting out. During Season 4 and beyond, he is romantically involved with Mouse. His icon resembles a Motorola logo, which is appropriate because Motorola helped to name his character (they also made a line of SURFR modems). He also speaks with a strong Australian accent.

 An adrenaline junkie, Ray longs for adventure and loves the danger of exploring the treacherous realm known as the Web. Captured by the Guardians for unauthorized Net travel, he is rescued by a reluctant Matrix. After saving AndrAIa from a fleet of CPUs, he joins the crew of the Saucy Mare in searching for Bob in the Web, acting as their guide. Matrix is, at first, angered by the Surfer's presence, due to his seeming attraction for AndrAIa, but grows to respect him after he risks his life to repair AndrAIa's damaged code.

 Ray was separated from the others when they neared the portal to Mainframe, but returned to Mainframe through the same portal Megabyte was sent through and remained to help the citizens evacuate into the Principal Office when the system was close to crashing. After the restart, during the war against Daemon, Turbo claimed to Mouse that Ray had been infected. After Daemon's defeat, Ray returned to Mainframe with the pre-season 3 Bob (unaware that he was Megabyte in disguise.) Through Season 4, Ray was featured on several brief occasions but had no speaking parts.
 
 His name is a reference to a computer graphics technique, ray tracing, and his nickname a reference to web surfing. The symbiotic link between him and his board are similar to that of the Marvel character Silver Surfer, with the ability to easily travel in conditions that are otherwise dangerous to other beings. Also, in the series Ray's board is actually called a "baud", which is also a measurement of the rate of a transmission.

Unspecified-class Webcreatures 
 These resemble Hammerhead sharks with a vertical head and no eyes. They have the ability to drain energy from sprites. They are born from ball-shaped eggs connected by vein-like tubes. Newborns have no armour and sleek skin. Older Webcreatures develop a carapace-like hide that can withstand a lot of punishment. Their teeth can also chew through many substances, including sprites and metal. Although one is never seen, they can grow to a gargantuan size, roughly the size of a ship. Its bones are used to cover the Captain's ship as an armature for the other carapace pieces.

Web Riders 
 These are sprites that have survived the web, but at a cost. They no longer require sustenance from energy foods but are deformed. Newer sprites keep their original appearance while older ones start resembling webcreatures; in the case of Bob after his exile by Megabyte, his hair changed into a wave-pattern, silver scales began to grow on his face, and his uniform began melting into his skin. One of the elder sprites only has one hand, a vaguely peg leg, and a face resembling the M-class Webcreature.  While these sprites do not speak normally like every other character, they do communicate through what appears to be dial-up modem clicks.  While not technically viruses, they have proven to be quite hostile in nature.

Season four characters

Daemon 
Voiced by Colombe Demers
A super-virus bent on infecting the entire Net, she succeeded in infecting the entire Guardian Collective, with the exception of only Bob and Matrix, and turned the Super Computer into her base of operations. She is religiously worshiped by those she infects, and known to them as "The Word" and addressed as "My Lady".

Daemon claims to strive for peace and unity in the Net and is different from other viruses in that she does not seem to believe that what she is doing is wrong, seeing herself as a messiah trying to "save" the Net. She speaks in a French accent and calls Mike the TV "Michel", and is depicted in the style of Joan of Arc, a petite female holy warrior.  She is a disconcerting villain because while what she is doing is insanely evil, her personality is actually quite gentle and benign (like referring to Mike the TV as "little one" and giggling). Despite her seeming benevolence, her infection turns people peaceful at the cost of their free will - to the point where they do not care if they die doing Daemon's will. Her possessed Guardians use lethal force countering any and all resistance. A Guardian hit squad was sent to retrieve Matrix (whom they mistook for Bob) while in presumably the early stages of her infection, and they were far more hard-edged than the infected Guardians in Season 4. Daemon is complicated in her feelings. She has an interest in the concept of love, taking time to observe it and stating that sprites are lucky because they can feel love when viruses cannot— or at least so she believes, given that Hexidecimal later violently opposes her almost purely based out of romantic love for Bob once she returns to her viral state. However she also has pride as a virus because when she found out that Hexidecimal was helping the sprites and had become sprite-like, she was enraged. In fact Hexidecimal is the only character in the entire series Daemon shows true animosity towards, calling her an abomination and a disgrace to her kind. This animosity disappeared when Hex returned to her true form: Daemon wondering why they were still fighting and stating that, as viruses, they should be friends. When her attempts to persuade Hex fail, she proves to be completely willing to continue their battle before her hourglass necklace empties its top half, sending her into the final stage of her attempted attack on the net.

In "The Episode With No Name", Turbo revealed Daemon to be the one who sent the Web creature to attack Mainframe in the first place (during Season 2's "Nullzilla"). The reason for this is unknown, but as Season 2 also had a reference to the Web "getting out of control and invading Systems", it may have been a diversionary tactic to keep the Guardians looking elsewhere. (Better Scenario) Since Daemon's army of Guardians lost their Key-Tools after becoming fully infected, she had briefly lost her chance to fully infect the entire Net. Since Daemon had full access to the Super-Computer and its records, she eventually learned of KiloByte's upgrade to Class-5 Virus GigaByte (flash-back in Season 4, prequel to Season 1). Since GigaByte has many high level functions such as creating portals, it was necessary for Daemon to gain control GigaByte, unfortunately, soon after becoming GigaByte, he was pulled into a portal to MainFrame and was split in two, thus creating MegaByte and Hexadecimal. After learning of the split, Daemon sent the Web creature to force the merger of MegaByte and Hexadecimal to create GigaByte once more. But again, GigaByte's life was shortly lived as he was later split by Bob (Season 2).

Daemon's plot involves keeping Net travel available, forcing Systems to remain open by destroying their Port Control Towers so inhabitants cannot take their system off the Net. As infected Guardians lack Keytools, she needs to keep Systems on the Net to be able to infect them as her army cannot create Portals; this also keeps the Systems isolated from each other, as no one System can stand against the Super-Computer. Instead of infecting the Systems outright, she puts her infection in egg-shaped viral bombs which are then placed in System Cores. At a specific point in time, they detonate and the whole System is infected - 92% of the Net was infected as a result. Her plan was to infect the whole Net and then, at a specific point in time, she would die and release the Cron code that would cause everything on the Net to count down; when they reached zero, they would spontaneously delete. The Net would be unified in the peace of total oblivion.

Her name is a reference to services running on Unix systems in the background as well as the Greek word "daemon".  "The Word" may be a reference to a unit of memory called a word. In her final scene she reveals that The Word is "Cron" ("I am not an entity, I am a time. My time is now. The Word is Cron."), and Bob realizes that she is a "cron virus"-an "end to all things" virus (possibly just an entry in a Unix system's "crontab" file, which is used by the "cron" process to run jobs at preselected times, chronologically). It may also be a reference to Cronos, the personification of time in Greek mythology. The chant that Daemon makes her followers say is a binary countdown. The first to do this is Daecon who counts down his deletion at 5 (101 in binary). The full binary countdown is 1010011010 which is the binary representation of the number 666.

Daecon 
Daemon's main advisor and assistant, and under the influence of The Word. His name is probably a word play on a "Deacon." Not much else is known about him. His name and character follow Daemon's religious motif. He was deleted (and gave the viewer an early look into Daemon's eventual "attack") when he killed himself, due to failing Daemon's order to penetrate Mainframe.

Dixon Green 
 Bob's partner when he was in the Guardian Academy as a cadet. She was Glitch's original owner, and had a very flippant and single-minded personality. Her name is taken from the British TV show Dixon of Dock Green. Deleted due to damage inflicted by Killabyte, as Killabyte was being upgraded to Gigabyte.

Killabyte 

 A virus that had been captured and was waiting for deletion at the hands of Guardian Dixon Green. Moments before his demise, Killabyte received a user upgrade and escaped his bonds. Bob (then a cadet) attempted to subdue the upgraded Killabyte, but was unsuccessful and he lay unconscious as the virus drained Guardian Dixon Green. Killabyte would have killed Bob but was transformed into Gigabyte and then pulled from the Super Computer to Mainframe.

 His name comes from another unit of computer memory, measuring approximately one thousand bytes. However his name is officially spelled "Killabyte", even though the spelling for KB is "Kilobyte".

Welman Matrix 
 Scientific genius and father of Dot and Enzo Matrix. He designed a gateway device that would have allowed Mainframers to connect to outside Systems, sending a series of pings into the Net to locate and contact Systems and then link to them. Unfortunately, Welman's experiment backfired due to his gateway pinging Killabyte and warping him into Mainframe as Gigabyte. The resulting explosion nullified Welman, split Gigabyte into the entities Hexadecimal and Megabyte, and destroyed Mainframe's sister city, the ruins of which were later to be known as Lost Angles. As a null, he was adopted as Nibbles by Megabyte, who apparently knew his true identity as he once referred to him as "Father."

 In Season 4, Hexadecimal's powers over nulls allowed him to regain his sentient mind and mold with other nulls to form a body. While catching up with his family, the young Enzo was found to have adapted to his dad's transformation quite well ("Dad's a null monster now, it's so cool!."), though Phong informed Welman of Matrix also being his son, there was no apparent interaction between the two during the series except for Matrix being glad his father had returned.

 Since Welman's ability to assert his personality is directly connected to Hexadecimal's well-being, she imbued young Enzo's icon with the same function before sacrificing herself to undo Daemon's Net-wide infection. When Enzo came in contact with him, Welman regained his sentient mind once more, and became able to move around by controlling a "Null-Bot", which he used to walk his daughter Dot down the aisle at her wedding. His robotic body is later infected by Megabyte at the end of season 4 and used to capture the young Enzo as everyone is forced to flee to the catacombs after Megabyte infiltrates the Principal Office. In Code Of Honor, he is initially enslaved to Megabyte and goes missing after the villain is destroyed.

 A flashback in Daemon Rising shows him rehearsing a lecture about his theories, in an homage to Daniel Jackson from the Stargate movie/series. In fact, his gateway command even looks like a Stargate.

References 

Animated characters
Fictional artificial intelligences
Lists of characters in Canadian television animation
Characters